The National Collegiate Table Tennis Association (NCTTA) is a non-profit organization whose aim is to promote competitive table tennis at the collegiate level in the United States and Canada. As of 2012, 155 universities competed in 28 geographical divisions, organized into 6 different regions throughout the United States, Canada and Puerto Rico.

Contests (Main Draw)
 Co-ed's Team
 Women's Team
 Divisional Meeting
 National Championship

Co-ed's Teams Contest

The co-ed's team contest consists of 4 male or female players competing with opposing schools. The format works by having 4 players each play singles matches against each other. They will play all 4 games even if one team has already won 3 games. If there is a tiebreaker, there will be a doubles match to determine the winner between the two schools.

Women's teams contest

The women's teams contest consists of at least 4 and a maximum of 8 female players from a university competing against another school. The format of this event is identical to Coed, except with all female players.

Divisional Competition

Throughout an NCTTA season, each division holds several competitions for its member schools during the Fall and Spring. All the member schools in a division play each other at least twice during a season. The champion from each division advances to the National Championship along with several wild card (at-large) selections based on team performance. NCTTA divisions include:

Upstate New York Central
Upstate New York Western
New England
Mid Atlantic
Carolina
Midwest
Northwest
New York City
Texas
Georgia
Florida
Northern California
Southern California
Ohio
Virginia
Dixie
Kansas
Minnesota

National Championship

Around April of each year, the divisional champions from the divisional tournaments compete with each other for the National Championships. This event is held in conjunction to the National Collegiate Singles, and doubles event sponsored by Association of College Unions International  (ACUI) until 2012. The eight events include Men's Team, Women's Team, Men's Singles, Women's Singles, Paralympic Singles, Men's Doubles, Women's Doubles. Cancelled events include Mixed Doubles, which was cancelled for 2012.

Media

The NCTTA has a bimonthly article published in the USATT magazine. The National Collegiate Championships and NCTTA membered schools have been featured on ESPN, Sports Illustrated.

Previous national Champions include:

New York University
Texas Wesleyan University
University of Illinois at Urbana-Champaign  
Johns Hopkins University

Sponsorship
Coca-Cola
Newgy Industries
Butterfly (table tennis equipment manufacturer)
 Double Fish

References

External links 
 National Collegiate Table Tennis Association
 List of Past Champions

American table tennis organizations
Canadian table tennis organizations
Puerto Rican table tennis organizations
Sports organizations established in 1991
1991 establishments in North America